Ultranet can refer to one of the following:

 Ultranet (company), a former telecommunications firm in Massachusetts, United States
 Ultranet (math), a term in topology
 , a HVDC-project in Germany
 Ultranet (product), an online environment developed by the Department of Education and Early Childhood Development in Victoria, Australia